Billesley may refer to:

Billesley, West Midlands, a district of Birmingham,
Billesley, Warwickshire, a village near Stratford-upon-Avon.